Ishimaru (written: 石丸 lit. "stone circle") is a Japanese surname. Notable people with the surname include:

, Japanese-American engineer and academic
, Japanese voice actor
, Japanese journalist
, Japanese actor and singer
Kazunari Ishimaru, Japanese engineer
, Japanese actor
, Japanese footballer
, Japanese boxer

Fictional characters
, a character in the visual novel Danganronpa: Trigger Happy Havoc

Japanese-language surnames